Gujrat Colony is a neighbourhood in the Baldia Town municipality of Karachi Pakistan.

There are several ethnic groups in neighbourhood including Muhajirs, Sindhis, Kashmiris, Seraikis, Pakhtuns, Balochis, Brahuis,
Memons, Bohras,  Ismailis, etc. Over 99% of the population is Muslim. The population of Baldia Town is estimated to be nearly one million.

References

External links 
 Karachi Website .

Neighbourhoods of Karachi
Baldia Town